Estonian Dance Sport Association (abbreviation EDSA) is one of the sport governing bodies in Estonia which deals with dance sport.

EDSA is established on 23 November 1991. EDSA was a member of World DanceSport Federation and is a member of Estonian Olympic Committee.

References

External links
 

Sports governing bodies in Estonia
Dance in Estonia
Dancesport organizations